Jason Kiree Huntley (born April 20, 1998) is an American football running back for the Pittsburgh Steelers of the National Football League (NFL). He played college football at New Mexico State, and was drafted by the Detroit Lions in the fifth round of the 2020 NFL Draft.

College career
Coming out of Martin High School in Arlington, Texas, Huntley was not highly recruited and signed with New Mexico State. He returned three kickoffs for touchdowns in 2018. In 2019, Huntley rushed for 1,090 yards (7.1 yards per carry) with nine touchdowns and also had 1,119 receiving yards.

Professional career

Detroit Lions
Huntley was selected by the Detroit Lions in the fifth round with the 172nd overall pick in the 2020 NFL Draft. On July 13, 2020, the Lions signed Huntley to a four-year contract. He was waived by the Lions during final roster cuts on September 5, 2020.

Philadelphia Eagles
Huntley was claimed off waivers by the Philadelphia Eagles on September 6, 2020. He made his NFL debut in Week 1 against the Washington Football Team, and had 1 rushing attempt for 1 yard. He finished the season playing in 5 games, rushing 5 times for 19 yards, and 1 reception for 0 yards.

On August 31, 2021, Huntley was waived by the Eagles and re-signed to the practice squad the next day. He was signed to the active roster on January 10, 2022. He was released on August 30.

Pittsburgh Steelers
On September 2, 2022, Huntley signed with the Pittsburgh Steelers practice squad. He signed a reserve/future contract on January 10, 2023.

References

External links
Philadelphia Eagles bio
New Mexico State Aggies bio

Living people
1998 births
American football running backs
New Mexico State Aggies football players
Detroit Lions players
Philadelphia Eagles players
Pittsburgh Steelers players
Players of American football from Texas
Sportspeople from Arlington, Texas